This is a list of some of the most notable bridges and viaducts in Stockholm, starting with those located closest to the city centre. Many more bridges and viaducts could, of course, be added, including those on the rail and motorway networks, and the many grade-separated junctions in the suburbs which are a product of postwar city planning.

Historical 
 Sveabron (where present-day Odengatan passes over Sveavägen)
 Nybro or Stora Ladugårdslandsbron (across today's Berzelii Park)
 Näckströms bro (connecting Norrmalm and Blasieholmen)

Additionally, during the cold winters in the 19th century, ice in the city harbour made it necessary to replace ferries by temporary pontoon bridges sometimes more than 300 m in length.

See also 
 Geography of Stockholm

References 

Bridges
 
Bridges
Bridges in Stockholm
Stockholm